A Hills Hoist is a height-adjustable rotary clothes line, designed to permit the compact hanging of wet clothes so that their maximum area can be exposed for wind drying by rotation. They are considered one of Australia's most recognisable icons, and are used frequently by artists as a metaphor for Australian suburbia in the 1950s and 1960s.

For decades, beginning in 1945, the devices were mainly manufactured in Adelaide, South Australia, using designs and patents purchased by Lance Hill. The local emphasis led to Hills Hoist becoming the generic term for rotary clothes lines in Australia. The manufacturer soon became nationally market-dominant and rotary washing (clothes) lines have become common across much of the world. Direct successors to his company now have mostly manufactured in China.

History 
As early as 1895, Colin Stewart and Allan Harley of Sun Foundry in Adelaide applied for a patent for an 'Improved Rotary and Tilting Clothes Drying Rack'. In their design the uppermost part tilted to allow access to the hanging lines.

Gilbert Toyne of Geelong patented, manufactured and marketed four rotary clothes hoists designs between 1911 and 1946. Toyne's first patented clothes hoist was sold through the Aeroplane Clothes Hoist Company established in 1911, prior to the First World War.

After returning from World War I, Toyne continued to perfect his designs, despite his own troubles stemming from injuries suffered from the war. In 1925, he patented an all-metal rotary clothes hoist with its enclosed crown wheel-and-pinion winding mechanism and began selling them the following year.

Prolific South Australian inventor Gerhard ‘Pop’ Kaesler also designed a modern rotary clothesline, two decades before they went into commercial production in Adelaide. Lance Hill bought the metre-high wooden prototype model and plans from Kaesler. In 1945, he began to manufacture the Hills rotary clothes hoist in his backyard. His wife apparently wanted an inexpensive replacement to the line and prop she had for drying clothes, as she had no room on the line due to her growing lemon tree.

Lance Hill's brother-in-law Harold Ling returned from the war and joined him to form a partnership in 1946. Ling became the key figure in expanding the production and marketing of the Hills hoist and seem to have dropped any idea of a possessive apostrophe from the outset. 

In 1947, Hills Hoists began manufacturing a windable clothes hoist which was identical to Toyne's expired 1925 patent with the crown wheel-and-pinion winding mechanism.

Initially the clothes hoists were constructed and sold from Lance Hill's home on Bevington Road, Glenunga. Soon production moved to a nearby site on Glen Osmond Road and within a decade the factory had relocated to a larger site at Edwardstown. The company Hills Hoists became Hills Industries in 1958.

In 1974, a Darwin family reported that the only thing left standing after Cyclone Tracy was their Hills Hoist. 

In January 2017, Hills Industries sold the manufacturing and sale rights of its Hills Home Living brands to AMES Australasia, a subsidiary of the American Griffon Corporation. As of 2018 Austral ClothesHoists and Daytek Australia are the only Australian manufacturers of rotary clotheslines.

Cultural impacts 
Hills Hoists are considered one of Australia's most recognisable icons, and are used frequently by artists as a metaphor for Australian suburbia in the 1950s and 1960s. The Hills Hoist is listed as a National Treasure by the National Library of Australia. The opening ceremony of the 2000 Sydney Olympics featured giant roaming Hills Hoist robots.

See also
Hammersmith Hills Hoists – Rugby League Football Club
Goon of Fortune – a drinking game involving a rotary line
Gilbert Toyne – inventor and owner of four relevant patents (expired)

References

Footnotes

External links

Hills Holdings Australia Parent Company
Greener Garden Solutions Hills sole appointed official distributor for the UK & Europe
Lifestyle Clotheslines Hills appointed official online distributor for Australia

Australian companies established in 1945
Products introduced in 1945
Australian inventions
Laundry drying equipment
Manufacturing companies based in Adelaide

el:Απλώστρα ρούχων
sv:Torkvinda